Dotalabrus is a genus of wrasses native to the Indian Ocean coasts of Australia.

Species
The currently recognized species in this genus are:
 Dotalabrus alleni B. C. Russell, 1988 (little rainbow wrasse)
 Dotalabrus aurantiacus (Castelnau, 1872) (Castelnau's wrasse)

References

 
Labridae
Perciformes genera
Marine fish genera
Taxa named by Gilbert Percy Whitley